During the 2004–05 season, the Guildford Flames participated in the British National League. It was the 13th year of Ice Hockey played by the Guildford Flames.

The majority of the team from the previous season returned to the Flames including: Paul Dixon, Neil Liddiard, Peter Michnac, Marian Smerciak, Milos Melicherik, Rastislav Palov, Jozef Kohut, Nick Cross and Peter Konder.

Stevie Lyle left Guildford to join the Bracknell Bees and was replaced by Miroslav Bielik. Other departures included Ryan Vince, Scott Levins, Tony Redmond and Mark Galazzi.

Some new arrivals included Neil Adams and Adam Walker, who spent the previous season with the Fife Flyers. Jason Baird also joined from the Central Hockey League's Indianapolis.

Player statistics

Netminders

Results

Regular season

Play-offs 
The top four teams from the playoff group stage meet in the semi-finals, which are a best of 3 series. The finals are a best of 5 series.

References

External links 
 Official Guildford Flames website

Guildford Flames seasons
Gui